USS Charleston may refer to:

 , a galley in commission from 1798 to 1802
 , a protected cruiser commissioned in 1889 and wrecked in 1899
 , a protected cruiser in commission from 1905 to 1923
 , a gunboat in commission from 1936 to 1946
 , an amphibious cargo ship in commission from 1968 to 1992
 , a littoral combat ship commissioned on March 2, 2019

In fiction
On the Beach (2000 film)

United States Navy ship names